Lake Linow is a volcanic lake located outside Tomohon, near Manado, Indonesia. Several hydrothermal vents spew hot gas from the edges and depths of the lake. The changing chemical composition of the lake means that it changes colors often, ranging from red, dark green, and even to dark blue. The lake is abutted on its sides by Mount Lokon and Mount Mahawu. The lake carries a fairly strong miasma of rotten eggs, due to the sulfur that is often in great quantities in the lake. The word "Linow" derives from the Minahasa word for "water gathering place".

References

Tomohon
Lakes of Sulawesi